This article is the discography of British ska revival band The Selecter.

Albums

Studio albums

Live albums

Compilation albums

Video albums

EPs

Singles

References 

Discographies of British artists